David de Meyne (c. 1569 – 1620)  was a Dutch cartographer, painter, publisher and art dealer. His early cartographic works combined maps, views and portraits.

Biography
His family name is sometimes spelled de Moyne / Meijnersen. He was born in Maastricht, in the region of Limburg around 1569. He later moved to Amsterdam, where he is attested as active from 1594 to 1620, and was reported as living on Nieuw Rockin in 1594. He became a citizen of Amsterdam on 6 August 1596.

On 12 November 1594 he married Janneken Laurens (1577 – 1618) in Amsterdam. On 6 June 1611, one of his children was buried at Nieuwe kerk. After her death, in 1618, he became engaged to Soetje Cornelis, whom he married on 18 August 1618 in Amsterdam.

In 1610 he completed Universi Orbis Tabula De-Integro Delineata, a world map of large size with inset portraits of Olivier van Noort, Ferdinand Magellan, Francis Drake, and Thomas Cavendish, the world's circumnavigators. 

The painting View of Ambon (Dutch: Gezicht op Ambon), dating from 1617, has been traditionally attributed to De Meyne. It was commissioned by the Heeren XVII, the board of directors of the Dutch East India Company, and hung in the East India House in Amsterdam. The painting is a homage to Frederik de Houtman, the first governor of the island, and summarizes the latter's topography and interests of the VOC in the island, namely cloves. The harbors and cities in VOC maps like this, infrastructures that supported the Dutch merchants's trade, were depicted as disproportionately large.

Gallery

References

Dutch cartographers
Dutch printers
Dutch art dealers
1569 births
1620 deaths
Dutch geographers
Dutch Golden Age painters
Dutch male painters
Artists from Maastricht
17th-century Dutch cartographers